The CONCACAF Champions League, formerly the CONCACAF Champions' Cup, is an association football competition established in 1962 by CONCACAF. It is considered the most important international competition for North American clubs. Clubs qualify for the Champions League based on their performance in national leagues. The competition has been completed 57 times through the 2022 event, with 59 champions due to a three-way shared title in the 1978 competition.

For the first 30 years, the final was contested over two legs, one at each participating club's stadium. Mexican team CD Guadalajara won the inaugural competition in 1962, defeating Guatemalan CSD Comunicaciones 6–0 on aggregate. For the 1992 edition, Club América from Mexico defeated Alajuelense from Costa Rica in the first single-legged final held at a neutral venue, the City Stadium in Santa Ana, California. The format returned to a two-legged series from the 2003 edition, excepting for the shortened 2020 edition that was affected by the COVID-19 pandemic.

Fourteen finals have featured teams from the same national association: Mexico (1996, 2002, 2003, 2006, 2007, 2009, 2010, 2012, 2013, 2014, 2016, 2017, and 2019) and Costa Rica (2004). América holds the record for the most victories, having won the competition seven times since its inception. Only four teams, all Mexican, have been able to retain their titles. This includes Monterrey (2011, 2012, 2013), Pachuca (2007, 2008), Cruz Azul twice (1969, 1970, 1971 and 1996, 1997), and América (2015, 2016). Teams from Mexico have won the most titles, winning 37 of the tournament's 58 editions. Robinhood from Suriname hold the record for the most losses in the final, having been runners-up on five occasions (1972, 1976, 1977, 1982, and 1983).

The last champions before the competition was renamed to CONCACAF Champions League were Pachuca, who beat Saprissa 3–2 on aggregate in the 2008 finals. Since the rebranding and change of format to Champions League in 2008, the competition has only had Liga MX champions and finalists, except on five occasions where Major League Soccer teams reached the final (2011, 2015, 2018, 2020, and 2022). Seattle Sounders FC became the first non-Mexican team to win the Champions League since the change of name when they defeated Mexican side Pumas UNAM 5–2 on aggregate in the 2022 final.

List of finals

 The "Season" column refers to the season the competition was held, and wikilinks to the article about that season.
 Finals are listed in the order they were played.

Performances

By club

†Title shared.

By nation

†Including one title shared.

Notes

References 

CONCACAF Champions League
CONCACAF Champions League